WNIU (90.5 FM) is a radio station licensed to Rockford, Illinois. The station is owned by Northern Illinois University, and airs classical music. It is part of Northern Public Radio along with WNIJ.

WNIU broadcasts in the hybrid digital HD format.

Translator

References

External links
Northern Public Radio

NIU
Mass media in Rockford, Illinois
Northern Illinois University
NPR member stations
NIU
Radio stations established in 1991
1991 establishments in Illinois